Any Port in a Storm is the debut album released by the Reggae band The Dirty Heads in 2008. The Special Edition was released in 2010. This is the only album without Matt Ochoa as the band's drummer. Any Port in a Storm was initially set to be released on Warner Bros. Records until the label and band mutually separated. The Dirty Heads, having kept the master recordings, later released the album through Executive Music Group (EMG), a division of Universal Music Group.

Billy Preston plays keyboards on multiple tracks on the album, in what would be one of the final sessions he recorded before his death. "Lay Me Down" was released as a single from this album. It peaked at No. 1 on the Billboard Alternative Songs chart.

Reviews
Any Port in a Storm has received generally mixed reviews from music critics. Writing for Allmusic, Ritchie Unterberger said the band "comfortably combine hip-hop and reggae with somewhat lesser dollops of conventional rock songwriting and arrangements" on the album. Dan Raper of PopMatters called it a "scattershot debut" and remarked that the Dirty Heads' "simplistic rhyme schemes and disconcerting use of the F-bomb ... quickly demonstrate there are leagues between this dick-hop and the intelligent, twisted witticisms of Why?"

Track listing

Charts

See also 
List of Billboard number-one alternative singles of the 2010s

References

2008 debut albums
Dirty Heads albums